Hazelton Township is a township in Barber County, Kansas, USA.  As of the 2000 census, its population was 213.

Geography
According to the USGS, it contains one cemetery, Rosehill.

Harqis Lake and Spicer Lake are within this township. The stream of Spring Creek runs through this township.

References
 USGS Geographic Names Information System (GNIS)

External links
 US-Counties.com
 City-Data.com

Townships in Barber County, Kansas
Townships in Kansas